The 2012–13 Qatari Stars Cup is the 4th edition of the league cup competition in Qatar. It started on 6 October 2012.

It features 12 teams from the Qatar Stars League divided into two groups, with the winner and runner-up of each group advancing to the semi-finals.

Round One

Group A

Group B

Semi finals

Final

References

Qatari Stars Cup
Football competitions in Qatar
2012–13 in Qatari football
2012–13 domestic association football cups